John Edmund Luck (1840–1896) OSB was the fourth Catholic bishop of Auckland, New Zealand (1882–1896). He was born in England.

Luck Crescent in Monte Cecilia Park, Hillsborough, Auckland was named in his honour in 1982.

Notes

References/Sources

 E.R. Simmons, A Brief History of the Catholic Church in New Zealand, Catholic Publication Centre, Auckland, 1978.
 E.R. Simmons, In Cruce Salus, A History of the Diocese of Auckland 1848 – 1980, Catholic Publication Centre, Auckland 1982.
 Bishop John Edmund Luck OSB, Catholic Hierarchy website (retrieved 12 February 2011)

1840 births
1896 deaths
19th-century Roman Catholic bishops in New Zealand
British emigrants to New Zealand
New Zealand Benedictines
Roman Catholic bishops of Auckland
Benedictine bishops
Pontifical Gregorian University alumni